Argonauta oweri is an extinct species of argonautid octopus. It is known from the early Pliocene of New Zealand.

The type specimen, a fossilised eggcase, measures 118 mm in diameter. Its aperture is 95 mm high and 40 mm across at its widest point (though it is slightly crushed).

The fossil was not found in situ and therefore its parent formation is unknown, though Hautapu River flows exclusively through early Pliocene rocks and according to the describing author "the horizon is almost certainly Waitotaran".

References

oweri
Fossil taxa described in 1945
Extinct animals of New Zealand
Molluscs of New Zealand